Marracash is the self-titled debut album by Italian rapper Marracash. It was released on 13 June 2008 in Italy, where its peak position was #11. The album was produced by Don Joe & Deleterio and the featured guests are J Ax, Club Dogo, Vincenzo da Via Anfossi and Co'Sang. The first single from the album, "Badabum Cha Cha", peaked at number 9 on FIMI.

Chart performance
The album charted for 22 weeks on the Italian Albums  Chart. It entered the chart at number 14 in week 25 of 2008, and its last appearance was on week 36 of 2008. It peaked at number nine, where it stayed for one week.

Track listing

Charts

References

2008 debut albums
Italian-language albums
Marracash albums